Girl Genius is an ongoing comic book series turned webcomic, written and drawn by Phil and Kaja Foglio and published by their company Studio Foglio LLC under the imprint Airship Entertainment. The comic won the Hugo Award for Best Graphic Story three times, has been nominated for a Hugo Award for Best Professional Artist and twice for Eisner Awards, and won multiple WCCA awards.

Girl Genius has the tagline of "Adventure, Romance, Mad Science!". It follows the main character Agatha Heterodyne (introduced in 1995) through an alternate-history Victorian-style "steampunk" setting, although elements veer from what is usually thought of as steampunk. Kaja Foglio describes it as "gaslamp fantasy" instead to suggest its more fantastic style.

As well as the comics, the Foglios have also written four Girl Genius novels, all published by Night Shade Books, and two games based on the world have been made.

Overview

Setting
The setting has been described as steampunk, with reviewers for Wired describing it as a "mosh of Victorian era, magic and emerging technology" and "steampunk to the core", but co-creator Kaja Foglio dislikes the term and instead coined the term "gaslamp fantasy" to describe the work. Kaja said in a blog post that when Girl Genius was first coming out, there was a comic called Steampunk and she wanted to avoid confusion. She added that "we have no punk, and we have more than just steam, [so] using a different name seemed appropriate." Girl Genius differs from classic steampunk in that technology is not just limited to machines but also encompasses biology such as "constructs" – biological creations which range from Frankenstein-style creatures to talking cats and mouse-sized mammoths.

Girl Genius is set in an alternate-universe Europe with Industrial Revolution-like surroundings, airships, and mad scientists called Sparks. These Sparks, who have incredible powers of invention, turned the Age of Enlightenment into a full-scale war that ravaged the continent, until Baron Wulfenbach brought an uneasy peace through force.

Plot 
Girl Genius tells the story of Agatha Clay, a student and apprentice at Transylvania Polygnostic University, whose experiments never work until she encounters an electromagnetic pulse and is robbed of her locket. This leads her to break free of an attempt to suppress her powers as a Spark and to hide that she is the long-lost daughter of famous hero Bill Heterodyne and villainess-turned-good Lucrezia Mongfish. Agatha Heterodyne (whose surname is based on a real scientific concept) learns to mix scientific genius, a streak of true heroism, and an obsessive possessiveness for what she considers her own in order to claim her monstrous heritage and birthright, even as the eyes of all Europa watch her carefully in case she turns out to be one of the monsters herself.

Publication history

The idea for the style of Girl Genius came about when Kaja Foglio went through some of Phil's loose drawings, saying in an interview: "I was going through all of Phil's old files and I was filing all of the old sketches, and I was coming across weird airships and cats in tophats with walking canes, and all of this wonderful... Victoriana sci-fi stuff... it was like 'Oh, this is everything I love!'" Phil Foglio said, "We wanted to do something with a strong female lead character. We both like the tropes associated with mad science, and I really enjoy drawing fiddly Victorian-style gizmos". 

Agatha Heterodyne first appeared in print in 1995 in a GURPS sourcebook that the Foglios illustrated. Phil Foglio states that plotting for Girl Genius started in 1993, and it was first published in 2000. Girl Genius: The Secret Blueprints Vol. I was printed in January 2001, followed closely by the monochrome Issue 1 in February. In 2005 Girl Genius became a webcomic, and quarterly print publication of the comic ceased. 

The first three printed issues (which make up Volume 1) were in black and white. Subsequent printed and web comics were in color. Volume 1 was inked by Brian Snoddy, Volumes 2 and 3 by Mark McNabb. Volume 4 by Laurie E. Smith, and all subsequent volumes by Cheyenne Wright. Wright also colored the comics of Volume 1; these colored versions were used for a new print edition of Volume 1 and have replaced the original comics on the website.

In an interview recorded in January 2008, shortly before they began releasing pages of volume 8 of Girl Genius on their web site, the Foglios stated that they expected the climax of Volume 8 to be the rough equivalent of "the end of the first season," and that it would provide a logical break in case of author catastrophe and a fresh jumping-on point for new readers. However, this was an underestimate of the length of the remaining "first season": the end of Volume 13 turned out to be approximately halfway through the planned overall story arc. The "second season" of the series began March 3, 2014, with "Act 2, Volume 1," after a two-month hiatus of the main story.

Published collections

The webcomic, as well as the initial printed issues, have been collected into printed volumes, and in some cases those volumes have been collected into printed omnibuses. Unless stated in the notes below, the books reprint works first published as the webcomic.

The First Journey of Agatha Heterodyne (also called "Act 1")

The Second Journey of Agatha Heterodyne (also called "Act 2")

Girl Genius in other media 
Girl Genius has been adapted, or proposed for adaptation, for other media:

Novels 

The Foglios have written four Girl Genius prose novels, which follow the same story as the comics:  

Agatha H. and the Airship City, covering volumes 1–3 of the comic;
Agatha H. and the Clockwork Princess, covering volumes 4–6;
Agatha H. and the Voice of the Castle, covering volumes 7–9; and
Agatha H. and the Siege of Mechanicsburg covering volumes 10–13.

The prose novels are published by Night Shade Books.

Games
Agatha Heterodyne appeared in two illustrations and by name in the 1995 role-playing game supplement GURPS Illuminati University. This sourcebook for GURPS was illustrated by the Foglios and predates the release of the comic.

Girl Genius: The Works is a card game designed by Phil Foglio and James Ernest, published in 2001. This game was an adaptation of an earlier game involving the Foglios called XXXenophile.

Girl Genius and the Rats of Mechanicsburg is a mobile game released in 2014 following a Kickstarter in 2012.
Further games are being planned:

 A role-playing game in the Girl Genius setting was first announced in 2005. Girl Genius RPG, also called Girl Genius Sourcebook and Roleplaying Game, was first announced by April 2005 by Steve Jackson Games, to be illustrated by the Foglios and co-written by Kaja Foglio and Michelle Barrett, as a supplement for the 4th edition GURPS Basic Set rules system. Barrett remained credited as a co-writer until October 2006 but was removed by December 2006. Phil called the work "GURPS Girl Genius" in a February 2007 interview. By March 2018 the Girl Genius FAQ said that while the project had been "dead for years", a new writer had been assigned in late 2017.  As of 2021, it has been released into print through Steve Jackson Games Incorporated. 

A Kickstarter for a new video game, entitled Girl Genius: Adventures In Castle Heterodyne, was started in September 2020.

Movie 
In 2010 it was reported that Felicia D. Henderson had optioned the rights to Girl Genius and was adapting it into a movie. However,  no movie had been produced.

Awards 
Girl Genius and its creators have won multiple Hugo Awards and Web Cartoonists' Choice Awards (WCCAs). They have also been nominated for further Hugo awards, WCCA awards, and Eisner Awards.

References

Primary sources
In the text, these references are marked with a double dagger: ‡

External links

2001 comics debuts
2005 webcomic debuts
American comedy webcomics
Comics about women
Drama webcomics
Feminist webcomics
Gaslamp fantasy
GURPS
Hugo Award for Best Graphic Story-winning works
Long-form webcomics
Science fantasy webcomics
Steampunk novels
Steampunk webcomics
Studio Foglio titles
Web Cartoonists' Choice Award winners
Webcomics in print
Webcomics from print